Apographon orestes is a species of snake of the family Colubridae.

Distribution 
The species is found in Bolivia and Argentina.

References

Dipsadinae
Reptiles of Bolivia
Reptiles of Argentina
Reptiles described in 2004]